Branden John Durst (born January 15, 1980) is a former politician from Boise, Idaho. Durst represented Idaho's 18th Legislative District in the Idaho Senate from 2012 to 2013. He previously represented Idaho's 18th Legislative District in the Idaho House of Representatives from 2006 to 2010 as a Democrat, until his resignation from the Idaho Legislature in 2013 for illegally representing his district while living in another state. He was the youngest and first openly gay member of the Idaho Senate. Durst switched parties in 2016 and registered as a Republican as of November 2020.  Durst announced in January 2020 that he would be a Republican candidate for Idaho State Superintendent of Public Instruction. He ultimately placed a distant second in the primary, earning about 34% of the vote.

Personal life 
Durst was born in Boise, Idaho in 1980. He grew up in south Boise and attended public schools and was a third generation graduate of Boise High School.

Durst attended Pacific Lutheran University (PLU) as undergraduate where he earned a bachelor of arts degree in political science and a minor in communication.

After graduating from PLU, Durst attended graduate school at Kent State University and Claremont Graduate University where he studied public policy analysis and international political economy, respectively. He returned to Boise, and subsequently enrolled at Boise State University (BSU) where he earned a Master of Public Administration degree. While enrolled at BSU, Durst earned an academic scholarship from the Department of Public Policy and Administration and a research assistantship from the Department of Economics. In May 2022, Durst earned an Education Specialist (EdS) degree in Executive Educational Leadership, also from BSU.

Durst is married to his wife, Cheri, and has four sons and a daughter. He works as a mediator and is on the Idaho State Supreme Court list of approved child custody mediators. Durst is a licensed pastor and attends Cloverdale Church of God in Boise.

Legal Matters 
In February 2022, a Washington state court granted a temporary protection order against Branden Durst and his current wife Cheri Durst. The order stems from an incident in December 2021, in which Durst's wife allegedly abused Durst's 14-year-old child on Christmas Eve. Eventually, a Washington state doctor reported an injured child to child protective services. The incident was investigated by the Ada County Sheriff's Department where Durst's current wife was later charged with injury to a child, in which she later plead guilty to disturbing the peace. 

In late April 2022, a judge in King County, Washington, found Durst in contempt of court on four occasions related to the custody agreement. The contempt allegations stem from events over Christmas 2021, when Durst, according to the court documents, violated terms of the parenting plan. https://www.idahopress.com/news/elections/idaho-superintendent-candidate-found-in-contempt-of-washington-court/article_546fb463-5e68-508e-894a-17a991643406.html Later in October 2022, Durst petitioned the King County Superior Court to lower child support. In the petition, Branden Durst claims "multiple false allegations" "dramatically reduced" his earning potential.

Idaho Legislature
In the Idaho Senate, Durst served as a member of the following committees:
 Agricultural Affairs
 Commerce and Human Resources
 Education

Durst was also a member of the joint Economic Outlook and Revenue Assessment Committee (EORAC).

As a member of the Idaho House of Representatives, Durst wrote the first law creating the Advanced Opportunities program along with legislative colleague Steven Thayn. Durst and Thayn wrote additional legislation expanding the program further while members of the state senate.

On November 20, 2013, Durst submitted his resignation from the Idaho Senate effective December 1, 2013, to Gov. Butch Otter. It was alleged by the press, but never verified, that Durst was splitting his time between Boise and the Seattle area, where his family had relocated. He was succeeded by Janie Ward-Engelking.

Elections

References 

1980 births
Boise State University alumni
Members of the Idaho House of Representatives
Living people
Idaho state senators
Pacific Lutheran University alumni
People from Boise, Idaho